

African-American legislators
The Nevada Legislature has included 29 self-identified African-Americans, the first being elected in 1966. There are ten African-American legislators serving as of the 2020 special sessions, including Speaker Jason Frierson.

Hispanic/Latino legislators
The Nevada Legislature has included 22 self-identified Hispanic/Latino legislators, the first being elected in 1874 with 70 years until the next Hispanic legislator was elected. There are ten Latino legislators currently serving as of the 2020 special sessions.

Asian American legislators
There have been three self-identified Asian Americans to serve in the Nevada Legislature. Although Sharron Angle said at a campaign stop in 2010 when running against Harry Reid for the United States Senate that, "I've been called the first Asian legislator in our Nevada State Assembly, " Angle never in fact identified herself as Asian American.  One Asian-American legislator is currently serving as of the 2020 special sessions.

Native American legislators
The Nevada Legislature has had one self-identified Native American member, with none serving as of the 2020 special sessions.

LGBT legislators
The Nevada Legislature has had six members who identify with the LGBT community, with two serving as of the 2020 special sessions.

See also
 Nevada State Capitol
 Nevada Assembly
 Nevada Senate

References